Ashton Brannon (born October 31, 1969) is an American Emmy Award-winning writer, director, visual artist, animator, and producer. He was a story artist and directing animator on Toy Story and co-director of Toy Story 2. He also directed and co-wrote the Sony Pictures Animation film Surf's Up. He also served as co-executive producer, story co-creator and writer on the Netflix animated series Arcane.

Early life
Brannon was born and raised in Columbus, Georgia.

Career
Brannon studied visual arts at Douglas Anderson School of the Arts in Jacksonville, Florida and went on to attend CalArts in its Character Animation program. He was accepted as a summer trainee at Walt Disney Animation Studios where he worked as an animation inbetweener on Disney's 1989 film The Little Mermaid. From 1990 to 1992. Brannon joined Warner Bros. Animation as a story artist and animator for such projects as Nike's Hare Jordan Super Bowl ad in 1992.

In 1993 Brannon joined Pixar Animation Studios as a story artist and directing animator on the studio's first animated feature film Toy Story, and story artist on their second film A Bug's Life before moving on to direct and help develop the storyline for Toy Story 2. Initially planned as a direct-to-video feature, the film was expanded in scope to become a theatrical feature. Brannon won an Annie Award for Outstanding Individual Achievement for Directing in an Animated Feature Production and Outstanding Individual Achievement for Writing in an Animated Feature Production. He was nominated for an Oscar in 2007 on Surf's Up.

Brannon joined Riot Games in 2016 to help craft the storyline for its animated series Arcane. Additionally he served as a co-executive producer and writer on Season One. Brannon, along with the show's creative team, won an Emmy for Outstanding Animated Program.

Most recently Brannon co-created the NFT animated series Stoner Cats. The six-episode series centers on an elderly woman suffering from Alzheimer's disease, and her five sentient housecats who must take care of her as she declines. The series was produced with partners Mila Kunis and Lisa Sterbakov of Orchard Farm Productions, and features a voice cast including Mila Kunis, Brannonton Kutcher, Jane Fonda, Seth MacFarlane, and Chris Rock.

Filmography

Films

Television

Video games

References

External links
 

1969 births
Living people
American animators
American storyboard artists
American male screenwriters
American animated film directors
Animation screenwriters
People from Columbus, Georgia
Writers from Columbus, Georgia
Film directors from Georgia (U.S. state)
Animators from Georgia (U.S. state)
Pixar people
California Institute of the Arts alumni
Annie Award winners
Sony Pictures Animation people
Primetime Emmy Award winners